Jayanti is a 2021 Indian Marathi-language social-drama film, directed by Shailesh Baliram Narwade and produced by Meliorist Film Studio. The film, starring Ruturaj Wankhede, Titeeksha Tawde and Milind Shinde, was theatrically released on 12 November 2021 in around 150 screens across Maharashtra and a few cities in other states. Jayanti was released digitally on 12 July 2022 and is streaming on Amazon Prime Video in Marathi and Hindi languages with English subtitles.

The film has been co-produced by Dr Anand Bankar, Amol Dhakadey, Dr Nilima Suhas Ambade and Dr Sudhir Hajare. It was presented by Dashami Studioz.

Cast 
 Ruturaj Wankhede as Santya/Santosh
 Titeeksha Tawde as Pallavi
 Milind Shinde as Ashok Mali
 Anjali Joglekar as Vatsala
 Vira Sathidar as Shrikant Mogre
 Amar Upadhyay as Vikas Kukreja
 Kishor Kadam as MLA Gondane
 Pandharinath Kamble as Dinesh Sathe
 Atul Mahale as Shambhu
 Saurabh Biramwar as Rahul
 Shubham Gautam as Shubham
 Akshay Khobragade as Chhotu
 Chetan Gadbail as Surya
 Pushpak Bhat as Rafiq
 Sneha Khandare as Safina
 Vibha Gajbhiye as Vandana
 Chetan Wagh as Munna
 Abhilash Yadav as Gajju
 Vaishali Dahake
 Piyush Wankhede
 Rutuja Wankhede
 Shubhangi Raut
 Rikesh Joshi
 Kiran Kashinath
 Ashwin Naik
 Mangesh Shirpurkar
 Niraj Jamgade (Michael)
 Pradeep Ronghe
 Amruta Koli
 Vinod Raut
 Omkar Landge
 Nagesh Burbure
 Nasir Rehman Shaikh
 Aditya Deshmukh
 Sahil Kene
 Prabhakar Shinde
 Pravin Shende
 Pranay Karande
 Saurabh Indorkar
 Swapnil Khairkar
 Gajanan Bakade
 Sanjay Chouhan
 RJ Bhavna

Reception

Jayanti was the first Marathi feature film to release in cinema halls after Covid19-related lockdown. The film started slow but got momentum in the third and fourth week due to word of mouth and completed 50 days in theatres. After watching the film, thousands of people took to social media to express their liking for the film. A few shows were also organized in United States of America, United Kingdom, Australia and Canada. The film had a week's theatrical run in Kuwait.

In the reviews, Mihir Bhange of The Times of India said Jayanti is a story of human emotions and it conveys it convincingly. 

Yogesh Pawar wrote in The Fress Press Journal that it's a Jayanti of solutions! 

Yogesh Maitreya wrote in News9Live that Shailesh Narwade's Jayanti is a spiritual successor to Nagraj Manjule's Fandry.

Harish Wankhede wrote in The Quint that Jayanti is a much-needed story in a world of upper-class heroes.

Soundtrack

Soundtrack of the film is composed by Ruhi and Mangesh Dhakde. Video of track "Tula Vandnyachi" sung by Javed Ali was released in October 2021.

References

External links
 

2020s Marathi-language films
2021 films
2021 romantic comedy-drama films
Films about the caste system in India
Indian romantic comedy-drama films
Films postponed due to the COVID-19 pandemic